Re:member is the fourth official solo album by Ólafur Arnalds released in August 2018. The album contains twelve tracks.

Track listing

References

Ólafur Arnalds albums
Electro (music)
Classical music
2018 albums